Lakewood is an unincorporated community and census-designated place (CDP) located within Lakewood Township, in Ocean County, New Jersey, United States. As of the 2010 United States Census, the CDP's population was 53,805.

Geography
According to the United States Census Bureau, the CDP had a total area of 7.323 square miles (18.966 km2), including 7.078 square miles (18.332 km2) of land and 0.245 square miles (0.634 km2) of water (3.35%).

Demographics

2010 Census

2000 Census
As of the 2000 United States Census, there were 36,065 people, 8,984 households, and 6,971 families living in the CDP. The population density was 1,944.8/km2 (5,039.2/mi2). There were 9,496 housing units at an average density of 512.1/km2 (1,326.8/mi2). The racial make-up of the CDP was 77.64% White, 12.24% African American, 0.20% Native American, 0.96% Asian, 0.04% Pacific Islander, 5.55% from other races, and 3.37% from two or more races. Hispanic or Latino of any race were 17.69% of the population.

There were 8,984 households, out of which 49.7% had children under the age of 18 living with them, 60.3% were married couples living together, 13.0% had a female householder with no husband present, and 22.4% were non-families. 18.2% of all households were made up of individuals, and 10.1% had someone living alone who was 65 years of age or older. The average household size was 3.83 and the average family size was 4.36.

In the CDP, the population was spread out, with 41.4% under the age of 18, 13.0% from 18 to 24, 25.7% from 25 to 44, 11.7% from 45 to 64, and 8.3% who were 65 years of age or older. The median age was 23 years. For every 100 females, there were 101.6 males. For every 100 females age 18 and over, there were 99.7 males.

The median income for a household in the CDP was $30,769, and the median income for a family was $32,748. Males had a median income of $35,672, versus $24,265 for females. The per capita income for the CDP was $11,802. About 26.4% of families and 29.1% of the population were below the poverty line, including 34.0% of those under age 18, and 18.5% of those age 65 or over.

References

Census-designated places in Ocean County, New Jersey
Lakewood Township, New Jersey

ca:Lakewood (Nova Jersey)
vo:Lakewood (New Jersey)